Gabriele Becker (born 17 April 1975) is a German former track and field sprinter who competed mainly over 100 metres. She represented her country at the 1995 World Championships in Athletics and won a bronze medal in the relay.

Born in Marburg, Becker took up track and field at a young age and trained at the LAZ Bruchköbel sports club. Initially she took part in a variety of events and completed youth heptathlons, but soon focused on sprinting instead. She won the German youth title over 100 m in 1991, then took German junior doubles in the 60 metres and 100 m in both 1993 and 1994. She made her international debut at the 1992 World Junior Championships in Athletics, finishing as a 100 m semi-finalist.

Becker's first international medal came with the German 4×100 metres relay team, when she anchored home a quartet including Sandra Roos, Birgit Brodbeck, and Carmen Bertmaring to the bronze medal at the 1993 European Athletics Junior Championships. She also finished seventh individually in the 100 m at that competition. At the 1994 World Junior Championships in Athletics, she was again a 100 m semi-finalist, but secured a silver medal with the relay team of Roos, Sandra Görigk and Esther Möller, finishing behind Jamaica.

After winning the German under-23 100 m title, she was selected to run at the 1995 World Championships in Athletics both individually and in the relay. She reached the quarter-finals of the 100 m, recording a best of 11.54 seconds in that round, but was eliminated in seventh place. A German senior women's team of Melanie Paschke, Silke Lichtenhagen, Silke-Beate Knoll, and Becker finished the relay final in a time of 43.01, with Becker anchoring the team to the finish line to secure the World Championships bronze medal behind the American and Jamaican teams.

Personal bests
100 metres – 11.34 seconds (1995)
200 metres – 23.63 seconds (1995)
60 metres indoor – 7.46 seconds (1997)

International competitions

References

External links



Living people
1975 births
Sportspeople from Marburg
German female sprinters
World Athletics Championships athletes for Germany
World Athletics Championships medalists